Wayamba is a community in Tamale Metropolitan District in the Northern Region of Ghana. It is a less populated community with nucleated settlement. People in the community are predominantly farmers and the women are also known for shea butter production.

See also
Suburbs of Tamale (Ghana) metropolis

References 

Communities in Ghana
Suburbs of Tamale, Ghana